Nyssus coloripes, known commonly in Australia as the orange-legged swift spider, but also as the spotted ground swift spider, the fleet footed spider and the painted swift spider, is a spider belonging to the family Corinnidae. It is found commonly in Australia and New Zealand.

Description 
Orange-legged swift spiders are mostly black in appearance, with white spots along most of the body and orange front legs. They are typically 6-7 mm in length.

Distribution and habitat 
The orange-legged swift spider is native to Australia. It was introduced to New Zealand around 1943 and is fully naturalised.

In New Zealand, it is commonly found inside homes and in short grassland.

Behaviour 
Orange-legged swift spiders are diurnal. They often hunt prey without the use of webs, though they may use their webs to detect prey.

References

External links 
 http://www.landcareresearch.co.nz/research/biosystematics/invertebrates/invertid/bug_details.asp?Bu_Id=224
  Supunna picta (L. Koch, 1873) Painted Swift Spider

Spiders of Oceania
Spiders described in 1873